Heston Airlines is a Lithuanian charter airline. Launched during 2021, Heston operates the Airbus A320-200 and A330-200.

Fleet

The Heston Airlines fleet consists of the following aircraft (as of November 2022):

See also
List of airlines of Lithuania

References

External links

Airlines of Lithuania
Airlines established in 2016
2016 establishments in Lithuania